The following is a list of all suspensions and fines enforced in the National Hockey League during the 2011–12 NHL season. It lists players and coaches (by team), their offense, and the punishments they received. During the regular season, the Vancouver Canucks was the only team that did not have any players or staff suspended or fined.

Suspensions
† - suspension covered at least one pre-season game

‡ - suspension covered at least one post-season game

* - suspension carried over to 2012–13 season

Fines

See also 
 2011–12 NHL transactions
 2011 NHL Entry Draft
 2012 in sports
 2011 in sports
 List of 2011–12 NHL Three Star Awards
 2010–11 NHL suspensions and fines

References

Suspension And Fines
National Hockey League suspensions and fines